A kettle hat, also known as a war hat, is a type of helmet made of iron or steel in the shape of a brimmed hat. There are many design variations. The only common element is a wide brim that afforded extra protection to the wearer. It gained its common English language name from its resemblance to a metal cooking pot (the original meaning of kettle). The kettle hat was common all over Medieval Europe. It was called Eisenhut in German and chapel de fer in French (both names mean "iron hat" in English).

Characteristics and use
Though similar brimmed helmets are depicted in illustrations of the Carolingian period, their use seems to have disappeared soon after. In the late 12th century, alongside the development of the enclosed helmet, the brimmed helmet makes a reappearance in Western Europe. Also in the 12th century the brimmed helmet begins to be depicted in Byzantine art, and it has been suggested that it was a Byzantine development. 

Early examples were made in the spangenhelm method, of a skull composed of framework filled with separate triangular plates, to which a brim was added. Later kettle hats were raised from a single piece of iron. Of a simple design requiring less time and skill to produce than some other helmet types, it was relatively inexpensive. It was worn most commonly by infantry, however, it was also used by cavalry and even men-at-arms. The wide brim gave good protection against blows from above, such as from cavalry swords, and was very useful in siege warfare as the wide brim would protect the wearer from projectiles shot or dropped from above. It could be worn with or without a mail coif, or later a mail standard or plate gorget, and was secured by a chin strap. The kettle hat had an advantage over some other types of helmet, in that it did not interfere with the wearer's vision, hearing or breathing.

Hat-shaped helmets were not just a European invention. Japanese Ashigaru infantrymen wore the jingasa, a helmet shaped like the Japanese form of the conical Asian hat.

Southeast Asians especially Burmese, Laotian and Siamese wore various kettle helmets. 

When steel helmets reappeared in World War I, the kettle hat made its comeback as the British Brodie helmet (often called tin hat), as well as the French Adrian helmet. These kettle helmets were also used in World War II by the British, Commonwealth forces (such as Australia and Canada).
The British produced a helmet for civilian use in World War II designed to give more protection to the head and neck from above.

See also
 Adrian helmet
 Brodie helmet
 Sallet
 Pickelhaube
 Stahlhelm

References

Bibliography
Bedford, John (1968) The Collecting Man, D. McKay, New York.
Connolly, P., Gillingham, J. and Lazenby , J. (1999) The Hutchinson Dictionary of Ancient and Medieval Warfare, Routledge 
De Vries, R. and Smith, R.D. (2012) Medieval Military Technology, Second Edition, University of Toronto Press, Toronto

External links

Medieval helmets
Combat helmets